AFR100 (African Forest Landscape Restoration Initiative) is an international partnership between African nations, financial interests both donor and business, technical organizations, and local interests which aims to restore more than 100 million hectares of land in Africa by 2030. It aims to have these efforts increase food security, combat poverty, and reduce the impacts of climate change within the continent. It is also part of the global Bonn Challenge to restore 150 million hectares by 2020 and 350 million hectares by 2030. As of Nov 29, 2021 they have commitments of 127.77% of their target from 31 African countries.

History 
Prior to its launch the initial planning was done in September 2015 at the 14th World Forestry Congress in Durban South Africa. The planned 100 million hectare goal brought about by this were then endorsed by a technical committee within the African Union's Department of Rural Development, Environment and Agriculture in October 2015. It was then launched in December 2015 during the 2015 United Nations Climate Change Conference's Global Landscapes Forum by a group of African nations and technical partners including the New Partnership for Africa's Development (NEPAD), the Federal Ministry for Economic Cooperation and Development (BMZ), and the World Resources Institute (WRI).

Governance

Governing Bodies

AFR100 Secretariat 

The organization's central communication hub it is housed with the New Partnership for Africa's Development. It acts to coordinate partners to obtain  political support, technical assistance, obtain investment, coordinate coalition creation, and act as a central repository for knowledge as well program monitoring.

It acts as a liaison to the Regional Economic Communities (RECs) of the African Union. The secretariat also provides public outreach and communication. This includes both activities such as updating the website and newsletter as well as communication with partner countries, donors, and technical partners. It also manages meetings both formal and ad hoc meetings for everything from those between countries down to technical groups working on specific topics. It receives the organization's financial support and creates the programs annual budget proposals for consideration by the Management team. New members apply to the organization through the Secretariat before confirmation by the Management Team.

AFR100 Management Team 
The management team is made up of the Federal Ministry for Economic Cooperation and Development (BIZ), the Deutsche Gesellschaft für Internationale Zusammenarbeit (GIZ), the International Union for Conservation of Nature and Natural Resources (IUCN), the New Partnership for Africa's Development (NEPAD), the World Bank, and the World Resources Institute (WRI). It also helps to organize technical partnerships for the program. It holds biannual meetings for the program. It also confirms the annual budgets of the program and new members.

Technical Partners and Financial Partners 
Technical partners who contribute or hold significant experience in technical, organizational, or geographic knowledge on forest landscape restoration are invited to join the program to participate in working groups in response to requests. Benefits include preeminent access to program data, the ability to access the program as a test platform for their approaches, as well as potentially compensation for responding to requests.

The case is much the same with financial partners who are selected based on their financial contributions to the program. Benefits include deep access to the program's data about development strategies especially economic and social effects.

Meetings/Temporary Groups

Ad hoc Working Groups 
These groups are created for providing knowledge for support on technical issues or implementation around specific areas under the ARF100 Secretariat but are primarily self organizing once created. These groups work primarily virtually and are open to all ARF100 partners technical, financial, and participating governments.

Annual Partner Meeting (APM) 
The AFR partner meeting brings together representatives from all partner groups and countries as well as donors, media, and other involved groups. It is hosted once a year by an interested partner country. It is a focal point for exchange of outcomes and future plans with the public at large as well to create connections and share knowledge between partners.

AFR 100 Advisory Group 
This is a large persistent group composed of members with two year terms proposed by the Secretariat and confirmed by the Management Team. Members are composed of representatives from countries, prominent donors, and financial partners. It exists to support the secretariat in advocating for the program, creating and maintaining partnerships, and providing strategic guidance allow the program to run most effectively.

Strategy

Guiding Principles 
AFR100 operates on eight guiding principles for its forest landscape restoration plans.

 Restore the environment in ways that provide multiple benefits in areas both economic and environmental. There is also not a requirement that the area be restored to its natural state, but rather restored to function and specifically the most beneficial function(s) possible. However, existing natural environments should be maintained in their current state or deficiencies repaired to natural function.
 Management integrated across scales due to benefits (and costs) being felt across large scales from local effects to regional effects that cross international boundaries.
 Include multiple simultaneous restoration strategies and objectives within a single area.
 Conduct interventions based on the decisions of stakeholder groups from all varieties of local groups and demographic groups, private sector interests, and governmental organizations. This including establishing long lasting institutions that integrate this goal.
 Create and preserve natural ecosystems that are resilient against both the effects short term climate as well as long term changes due to global warming. Both in preservation of biodiversity and economic aspects.
 Establish systems for continual monitoring of the forest restoration process both to determine whether changes to the programs within the area in how programs are run and whether goals for the area should change. On top of that knowledge gained through this process will be continually used to improve techniques utilized.
 Ensure coherent national policy as prior commitments and legal frameworks may conflict with plans of AFR100 programs and to ensure stability to encourage outside investment.
 Implement forest landscape restoration with nationally driven systems as to maintain coherence as without strong guidance measures taken to ensure goals of the program are reached likely to be less or possibly minimally effective

Main Restoration Techniques 
The most common land use strategies fall under three categories: fully forested land, agricultural land, and protective or buffer lands.

Fully forested lands include silviculture to restore existing forests through proper management. Land without forests can be allowed to regenerate on its own or with small/initial assistance to a natural state or made into an actively managed forest for growing and using/selling products of the tree.

Partially forested agricultural lands can be managed fallow lands to restore soil health or agroforestry where trees are co-cropped with other plants at some density from simple windbreaks to high densities that can provide partial shade to the crops.

Buffers fall into two categories. Mangroves forests are important as wetland environments for maintenance of biodiversity and can also act to mitigate storms. Buffers along steep areas as well as watercourses can reduce erosion and flooding.

Current Partners and Plans

References

Forest conservation organizations
Forestry in Africa